Eva Anna Gijsberta Smits (26 October 1906, Amsterdam – 23 April 1992, Schagen) was a Dutch freestyle swimmer who competed in the 1928 Summer Olympics.

In 1928 she was also a member of the Dutch relay team which was disqualified in the final of the 4 x 100 metre freestyle relay competition.

External links
profile

1906 births
1992 deaths
Dutch female freestyle swimmers
Olympic swimmers of the Netherlands
Swimmers at the 1928 Summer Olympics
Swimmers from Amsterdam
20th-century Dutch women
20th-century Dutch people